Stefanowicz is a Polish patronymic surname derived from the given name Stefan . Notable people with the surname include:

Antoni Stefanowicz
John Stefanowicz
Kajetan Stefanowicz
Magdalena Stefanowicz
Monika Stefanowicz
Maurycy Stefanowicz
Steven Stefanowicz

See also

 Polish-language surnames
 Patronymic surnames